Indiana Bible College (IBC) is a Bible college endorsed by the United Pentecostal Church International (UPCI). Founded in 1981 by Rev. Dennis Croucher of Seymour, Indiana, United States, it relocated to Indianapolis in 1988 under the direction and sponsorship of Rev. Paul D. Mooney and Calvary Tabernacle of Indianapolis, Indiana. Its campus is located at 1502 East Sumner Avenue – the site of the former University Heights Hospital, one-half mile north of the University of Indianapolis in University Heights.

Academics
Indiana Bible College focuses on preparing students for careers in professional ministry. The college offers Associate of Arts and Bachelor of Arts programs in Biblical Studies, Worship Studies, and Missiology with academic minors in religious education, missiology, social science, theology, communications and media, and worship studies, youth ministries, and urban ministries. Indiana Bible College provides leadership across the United Pentecostal Church International, both in music and theology. All degrees that are offered have not been accredited by any higher accreditation agencies. However, IBC credits and degrees routinely transfer to institutions of higher learning, and several students have used IBC degrees to obtain accredited master's degrees and Doctorates from around the country in various fields, though not in every case. Urshan Graduate School of Theology, the accredited seminary of the UPCI, accepts degrees from IBC because their accrediting agency considers IBC equivalent to an accredited institution. For the past several years, IBC has been the largest UPCI Bible college. It offers on-site courses, night classes, a large External Studies program, and Spanish course offerings at the main campus.

The Worship Studies Department has several groups that travel extensively ministering throughout the country, IBC PRAISE is a premier group, ministering before crowds of upwards of 22,000 people. IBC Chosen, Chorale, Singers, Anthem, among others travel across North America. Smaller Ministerial Student Association groups, often numbering several per weekend, also minister in various places, with a preaching contingent also.

The Missiology Studies Department expanded in Fall 2015, and now has two long-time missionaries: Robert K. Rodenbush and William Turner as integral parts of the Department.

Perspectives Magazine is the official magazine of IBC. It has a readership of about 20,000 per issue, making it the largest circulated Apostolic Pentecostal periodical in North America.

Jim Sleeva has been a missionary, prison chaplain, youth counselor, and Bible College instructor for many years.  In June 2020, Rev. Jason Gallion became the Executive Vice President. The Dean of Worship Studies, Lindel Anderson, holds a Doctor of Worship Studies (D.W.S) degree. The Director of Promotions, Rev. Chris Henderson, holds a Master of Arts in Ministry. Rev. Tim Massengale and the Dean of Biblical Studies, Rev. Bobby Killmon both have MDivs.  President Joshua B. Carson is an international speaker, writes an article for Perspectives monthly, has previously served as the General Youth President of the United Pentecostal Church International headquartered in Weldon Spring, Missouri, and as of June 2020 is the Pastor of Calvary Tabernacle, one of the largest Oneness Pentecostal churches in the State of Indiana. Calvary's weekly services are streamed around the world, with Pastor Carson as the primary speaker.

The library has around 20,000 volumes and a broad range of scholarly and practical periodicals are also accessible to students. A rare book room contains many volumes for special areas of study and learning.

External links
Official website

Universities and colleges affiliated with the United Pentecostal Church International
Pentecostal universities and colleges
Seminaries and theological colleges in Indiana
Universities and colleges in Indianapolis
Educational institutions established in 1981
1981 establishments in Indiana
Religion in Indianapolis